Lethbridge to Sweet Bay, branded as Lethbridge and Area, is a local service district (LSD) in the Canadian province of Newfoundland and Labrador.

History 
The Lethbridge to Sweet Bay LSD was established in 2010.

Geography 
Lethbridge to Sweet Bay is in Newfoundland within Subdivision E and Subdivision F of Division No. 7. The Lethbridge to Sweet Bay LSD includes the communities of Brooklyn, Charleston, Jamestown, Lethbridge, Morley's Siding, Portland, Sweet Bay, and Winterbrook.

Government 
Lethbridge to Sweet Bay is an LSD that is governed by a committee responsible for the provision of certain services to the community. The chair of the LSD committee is Kevin Pennie.

See also 
List of communities in Newfoundland and Labrador
List of local service districts in Newfoundland and Labrador

References

External links 

Local service districts in Newfoundland and Labrador